Numenes is a genus of tussock moths in the family Erebidae. The genus was erected by Francis Walker in 1855.

Species
Numenes contrahens Walker, 1862 Sumatra, Peninsular Malaysia, Borneo
Numenes disparilis Staudinger, 1887 south-eastern Siberia
Numenes flagrans Tams, 1928 Assam
Numenes insignis Moore, [1860] Java, Sumatra, Borneo
Numenes insolita Schultze, 1910 Palawan
Numenes siletti Walker, 1855 north-eastern India, Peninsular Malaysia
Numenes strandi Bryk, 1935 Philippines
Numenes takamukui Matsumura, 1927 Taiwan

References

Lymantriinae
Moth genera